Hildegard Lewy ( Schlesinger; 17 November 1903 – 8 October 1969) was an Assyriologist and academic. Having originally trained as a physicist, upon her marriage to Julius Lewy she moved into Assyriology; she specialised in cuneiform texts and Babylonian mathematics. She translated, commented on, and published a number of texts from Nuzi and Mari. She also contributed two chapters to The Cambridge Ancient History. She was a professor of Assyriology at the Hebrew Union College-Jewish Institute of Religion.

Born in Cluj-Napoca, Transylvania, Lewy was the daughter of Ludwig Schlesinger, a mathematician. She studied at the University of Giessen, and completed a doctorate in physics in 1926.

Selected works

References

1903 births
1969 deaths
Writers from Cluj-Napoca
University of Giessen alumni
Assyriologists
Hebrew Union College – Jewish Institute of Religion faculty